Theodotus, patriarch of Antioch (died 429), in AD 420 succeeded Alexander, under whom the long-standing schism at Antioch had been healed, and followed his lead in replacing the honoured name of Chrysostom on the diptychs of the church. He is described by Theodoret, at one time one of his presbyters, as "the pearl of temperance," "adorned with a splendid life and a knowledge of the divine dogmas". Joannes Moschus relates anecdotes illustrative of his meekness when treated rudely by his clergy, and his kindness on a journey in insisting on one of his presbyters exchanging his horse for the patriarch's litter. By his gentleness he brought back the Apollinarians to the church without rigidly insisting on their formal renouncement of their errors. On the real character of Pelagius's teaching becoming known in the East and the consequent withdrawal of the testimony previously given by the synods of Jerusalem and Caesarea to his orthodoxy, Theodotus presided at the final synod held at Antioch (mentioned only by Mercator and Photius, in whose text Theophilus of Alexandria has by an evident error taken Theodotus' place) at which Pelagius was condemned and expelled from Jerusalem and the other holy sites, and he joined with Praylius of Jerusalem in the synodical letters to Rome, stating what had been done. The most probable date of this synod is that given by Hefele: A.D. 424. When in 424 Alexander, founder of the order of the Acoemetae, visited Antioch, Theodotus refused to receive him as being suspected of heretical views. His feeling was not shared by the Antiochenes, who, ever eager after novelty, deserted their own churches and crowded to listen to Alexander's fervid eloquence. Theodotus took part in the ordination of Sisinnius as patriarch of Constantinople, in February 426, and united in the synodical letter addressed by the bishops then assembled to the bishops of Pamphylia against the Massalian heresy. He died in 429.

References

This article contains text from Henry Wace and William C. Piercy's Dictionary of Christian Biography and Literature to the End of the Sixth Century A.D., with an Account of the Principal Sects and Heresies. This work (published 1911) is now in the public domain.

429 deaths
Patriarchs of Antioch
5th-century Byzantine bishops
5th-century archbishops
Year of birth unknown